Jamie Murray and Bruno Soares were the defending champions, but lost in the final to Henri Kontinen and John Peers, 4–6, 3–6.

Seeds

Draw

Draw

Qualifying

Seeds

Qualifiers
  Daniel Nestor /  Denis Shapovalov

Lucky losers
  Marcus Daniell /  Wesley Koolhof

Qualifying draw

External links
 Main draw
 Qualifying draw

Queen's Club Championships - Doubles
2018 Queen's Club Championships